Simon Young is an English-born Pitcairnese politician. He is currently Mayor of Pitcairn, the first non-native Pitcairn Islander to hold the position. He previously served as Deputy Mayor from 2009 to 2013.

Biography
Originally from Pickering in North Yorkshire, Young served in the Royal Air Force for ten years.

He visited Pitcairn in 1992 and returned permanently in 1999 with his American wife Shirley, becoming the first people with no connection to the island to be naturalised.  He is editor of the island newspaper The Pitcairn Miscellany, and the island's conservation officer.

In 2009 Young ran in the elections for Deputy Mayor and was elected in a run-off against Jay Warren by 21 votes to 19, becoming the first non-native to hold the post. He ran for the mayoralty in the 2013 elections, losing by one vote in the third round of voting to Shawn Christian after the two candidates had been tied in the first two rounds. He later served on the Island Council and as the island's magistrate.

In the 2022 mayoral election he was elected mayor by 19 votes to 16, becoming the first non-native to head the island's government.

References

External links

Living people
20th-century births
Year of birth missing (living people)
People from Pickering, North Yorkshire
Royal Air Force personnel
English emigrants to the Pitcairn Islands
Mayors of the Pitcairn Islands
Members of the Island Council of the Pitcairn Islands